Néstor Gabriel Cedrés Vera (born March 3, 1970 in Minas) is a Uruguayan footballer. He has played for various teams in Uruguay, Argentina and Mexico.

Playing career

Titles

External links

1970 births
Living people
Uruguayan footballers
Uruguayan expatriate footballers
Uruguay international footballers
1991 Copa América players
Peñarol players
Club Atlético River Plate (Montevideo) players
Montevideo Wanderers F.C. players
Argentinos Juniors footballers
Club Atlético River Plate footballers
Boca Juniors footballers
Club América footballers
Deportivo Maldonado players
Uruguayan Primera División players
Argentine Primera División players
Liga MX players
Copa Libertadores-winning players
Expatriate footballers in Argentina
Expatriate footballers in Mexico
Association football forwards